Bathytoma gordonlarki is a species of sea snail, a marine gastropod mollusc in the family Borsoniidae.

Description
The size of the shell varies between 40 mm and 65 mm.

Distribution
This marine species occurs off the Philippines.

References

 Tucker J.K. & Olivera B.M. (2011) A new species of Bathytoma (Gastropoda: Borsoniidae) from the Philippines. The Nautilus 125(3): 164-166.

External links
 

gordonlarki
Gastropods described in 2011